Dimetacrine (brand names Istonil, Istonyl, Linostil, Miroistonil), also known as dimethacrine and acripramine, is a tricyclic antidepressant (TCA) used in Europe and formerly in Japan for the treatment of depression. It has imipramine-like effects; though, in a double-blind clinical trial against imipramine, dimetacrine was found to have lower efficacy in comparison and produced more weight loss and abnormal liver tests. Little is known about the pharmacology of dimetacrine, but it can be inferred that it acts in a similar manner to other TCAs. If this is indeed the case, dimetacrine may induce severe cardiac toxicity in overdose (a side effect unique to the tricyclic class of antidepressants).

See also
Melitracen

References

Dimethylamino compounds
Tricyclic antidepressants